Louis Lapointe (born 15 April 1992) is a French male canoeist who won 26 medals at senior level at the Wildwater Canoeing World Championships.

He won a Wildwater Canoeing World Cup in C1.

Medals at the World Championships
Of his 26 medals at the world championships, 9 were at individual level and 17 at team level.
Senior

References

External links
 

1992 births
Living people
French male canoeists
21st-century French people